Ryan Gondoh (born 6 June 1997) is an English professional footballer who plays as a winger for Lewes.

After a youth career in non-League football with Whyteleafe and briefly Carshalton Athletic, Gondoh signed a professional contract at Barnet where he made his professional debut in 2015. He had loan spells with Hendon and Staines Town being released by the club. He spent time with Metropolitan Police, Kingstonian and a second spell with Carshalton before joining Maldon & Tiptree. His performances with the Jammers earned him another professional contract at Colchester United in 2018. He joined Halifax Town on loan in March 2019. In the summer of 2019, Gondoh was released by Colchester and returned to non-league

Career
Born in Sutton, London, Gondoh is a left winger who can also play at left-back. He was a member of the youth team at Whyteleafe, where he won the youth player of the year award for the 2013–14 season. Towards the end of 2013–14, he played twice for Carshalton Athletic in the Isthmian League Premier Division.

He joined Barnet for the 2014–15 season where he helped the under-18 side to the Football League Youth Alliance South East Conference title. He then signed a one-year professional contract with Barnet for 2015–16. He made his professional debut for the club on 1 September 2015 as a substitute for Shaun Batt during Barnet's 1–0 Football League Trophy defeat to Yeovil Town. He joined Isthmian League Premier Division side Hendon on loan in December 2015 where he made five league appearances. In February 2016, he was sent on loan to Hendon's league rivals Staines Town for one month alongside teammate Harry Taylor. He was released by Barnet at the end of the season.

In Summer 2016, Gondoh joined Isthmian League Premier Division side Metropolitan Police, where he made ten appearances, before joining league rivals Kingstonian in October 2016. He scored once in 10 games for the club. In early 2017, Gondoh returned to Carshalton. He signed for Isthmian League North Division side Maldon & Tiptree for the 2017–18 campaign, where he would make 29 appearances and scored 12 goals.

On 3 January 2018, he joined League Two side Colchester United on an 18-month contract alongside former Maldon & Tiptree teammate Junior Ogedi-Uzokwe. He made his English Football League debut on 28 April, coming on as a substitute for Drey Wright during Colchester's 0–0 draw with Swindon Town.

Gondoh signed for National League side Halifax Town on 16 March 2019 until the end of the season. He made his club debut on 23 March as a substitute in Halifax's 2–0 home win against Solihull Moors.

Gondoh was released by Colchester United at the end of his contract in summer 2019.

After briefly re-joining Carshalton at the start of the 2019–20 season, Gondoh signed for Concord Rangers on a permanent contract in October 2019. In January 2020 he re-joined Whyteleafe. He joined Hampton & Richmond Borough on dual registration on 10 November 2020 as the Isthmian League season was suspended due to coronavirus restrictions. 

On 17 March 2021, Gondoh signed for Wealdstone. Gondoh scored his first goal for Wealdstone, and his first at National League level, against Bromley on 2 April 2021, in a 2-2 draw. He scored a brace in Wealdstone's final day 4-2 win over Woking, taking his goal tally up to 4 for the season.

On 1 June 2021, it was announced that Gondoh had agreed a move to Hampton & Richmond Borough for the 2021–22 season. Gondoh made a total of 17 appearances for the Beavers, scoring three times.

On 31 December 2021, Gondoh re-signed for Wealdstone He would remain there for just two weeks however, and would move to Scottish Championship side Ayr United on a two-year deal, becoming new manager Lee Bullen's first signing.

On 3 December 2022, Gondoh signed for Isthmian League Premier Division side Lewes.

Personal life
Gondoh was a promising athlete in his youth. As an under-13, he was seventh in his age group for the 75m hurdles, and 28th for the 60 metres.

In May 2021 Gondoh had entered into an altercation with a homeless woman where Gondoh was called a racial epithet, in response Gondoh filmed himself kicking over her cup of change and throwing liquid in her face.

Gondoh and his team mates have since received racist messages, some containing death threats. Wealdstone FC stated that "We are fully supporting Ryan and everyone else at the club who has been abused" and are refusing to comment further on the matter. However he was released from his contract a week later.

Career statistics

References

External links

1997 births
Living people
Footballers from Sutton, London
English footballers
Black British sportspeople
Association football wingers
Association football fullbacks
Whyteleafe F.C. players
Carshalton Athletic F.C. players
Barnet F.C. players
Hendon F.C. players
Staines Town F.C. players
Metropolitan Police F.C. players
Kingstonian F.C. players
Maldon & Tiptree F.C. players
Colchester United F.C. players
FC Halifax Town players
Concord Rangers F.C. players
Hampton & Richmond Borough F.C. players
Wealdstone F.C. players
Ayr United F.C. players
Sevenoaks Town F.C. players
Lewes F.C. players
Isthmian League players
English Football League players
National League (English football) players
Scottish Professional Football League players